Rekovac is a small town and municipality located in the Pomoravlje District of central Serbia. According to 2011 census, the population of the town is 1,587, while population of the municipality is 10,971. Rekovac is the center of small geographical region called Levač.

The town has a river called Dulenka, named after one of the settlements in the municipality. There are two schools in Rekovac: a primary school called Svetozar Marković, and a highschool called Poljoprivredno-veterinarska škola.

History
From 1929 to 1941, Rekovac was part of the Morava Banovina of the Kingdom of Yugoslavia.

Demographics

Economy
The following table gives a preview of total number of employed people per their core activity (as of 2017):

References

External links 

 
 Villages around Rekovac

Populated places in Pomoravlje District
Municipalities and cities of Šumadija and Western Serbia